Fred Gould (18 September 1891 – 15 February 1954) was an Australian cricketer. He played in seven first-class matches for South Australia between 1922 and 1925.

See also
 List of South Australian representative cricketers

References

External links
 

1891 births
1954 deaths
Australian cricketers
South Australia cricketers
Cricketers from Adelaide